Teotl Studios is an independent video game development studio located in central Sweden. 

The studio released its debut-game The Ball in October 2010 and its second game Unmechanical, jointly developed with Talawa Games, in August 2012. Their latest Unreal Engine 4 game is The Solus Project that was co-developed by Grip Digital.

References

External links 

Video game development companies
Video game companies established in 2010
Swedish companies established in 2010
Video game companies of Sweden